Anders Erik Gunnar Adlercreutz (born 26 April 1970, Helsinki) is a Finnish architect and politician, representing the Swedish People's Party of Finland in the Parliament of Finland since 2015. He was elected to the Parliament from the Uusimaa constituency in the 2015 election with 3,337 votes. He was re-elected as MP in 2019, garnering 9,425 votes.

In June 2016, Adlercreutz ran for the chairmanship of SFP, finishing second behind Anna-Maja Henriksson. He was subsequently elected as the vice-chairman of the party. He was re-elected in May 2018.

References 

1970 births
Living people
Politicians from Helsinki
Swedish-speaking Finns
Finnish architects
Swedish People's Party of Finland politicians
Members of the Parliament of Finland (2015–19)
Members of the Parliament of Finland (2019–23)
Aalto University alumni

Anders